Prajakta Sawant (born 28th October, 1992) is a badminton player from India. She was the national women's doubles champion in 2010 and 2011 and also won the mixed doubles title in 2010. In 2013, she won the Bangladesh International tournament partnered with Arathi Sara Sunil.

In 2007, at age 14, she made history by becoming the first Indian female to win a gold medal in the Asian Badminton Championship. She achieved this feat alongside Raj Kumar, as they won the Asian Bandminton Championship U-16 mixed doubles title. In 2009, she once again made history by becoming the first Indian female to win a bronze medal in the same tournament, but this time in the U-19 mixed doubles category. 

In 2010, when she participated, she was the youngest player on the badminton court. In 2010, Prajakta was selected to be a part of the Indian team for the Asian Games, and she was the youngest badminton player to participate in this prestigious event. 

Despite her hustling attitude and successful career, Prajakta has also faced challenges and controversies within the badminton community. Read more about it.

Achievements

Asia Junior Championships 
Mixed doubles

BWF International Challenge/Series (8 titles, 6 runners-up)
Women's doubles

Mixed doubles

 BWF International Challenge tournament
 BWF International Series tournament

References

External links
 

Indian female badminton players
1992 births
Living people
Racket sportspeople from Mumbai
Sportswomen from Maharashtra
21st-century Indian women
21st-century Indian people
Badminton players at the 2010 Asian Games
Asian Games competitors for India
20th-century Indian women